VidCon is an annual convention for fans, creators, executives, and online brands. The event primarily features prominent video stars from across the internet. In October 2020, VidCon Now relaunched as an ongoing, free digital offering. Veteran YouTube creators John and Hank Green (Vlogbrothers) founded VidCon, which Viacom (now Paramount) later acquired in 2018. Its offices remain in Missoula, Montana, sharing a building with Complexly. VidCon’s international presence continues to expand with additional events planned in Singapore, Abu Dhabi, Mexico City, and São Paulo.

History

The first VidCon was held on July 9–11, 2010, at the Hyatt Regency Century Plaza hotel in Los Angeles and sold out in advance, with over 1,400 people attending.

In February 2018, Viacom (owner of the Viacom Media Networks and film studio Paramount Pictures) announced that they were acquiring VidCon, as part of its efforts to expand its live events business and expand from TV programming to next-generation entertainment platforms. Jim Louderback will remain the CEO of the convention, and co-founder Hank Green will continue to be involved and work closely with the team. Its offices will also exist in Missoula, Montana. Internet reception to this acquisition was mixed, with some noting the irony of Viacom acquiring VidCon a decade after their lawsuit against Google and YouTube for copyright infringement. Hank Green reassured fans that Viacom's acquisition would allow the convention to flourish. Three conferences were cancelled in 2020 due to the COVID-19 pandemic, and a series of online programming, VidCon Now, became available for registration.

In March 2021, VidCon announced that it would host its next U.S. conference at the Anaheim Convention Center from October 22–24, 2021, delayed from its usual summer scheduling in order to increase the chance that an in-person event could be held. VidCon also announced that TikTok would be the top sponsor of the 2021 event, replacing YouTube who had been the main sponsor since 2013. On August 20, however, VidCon announced the cancellation of its 2021 event "due to the recent increases in COVID-19 cases [in California] and evolving health and safety mandates." The convention was rescheduled to June 22–25, 2022 in Anaheim.

Attendance

International conventions

References

External links
 
 

Web-related conferences
Green brothers
Internet culture
Social media
Virtual communities
Computer-related introductions in 2010
Recurring events established in 2010
Nickelodeon
Paramount Global subsidiaries